Middle Tennessee Blue Raiders football program represents Middle Tennessee State University in the sport of American football. The Blue Raiders compete in the Football Bowl Subdivision (FBS) of the National Collegiate Athletic Association (NCAA) and the East Division of Conference USA (CUSA). They are coached by Rick Stockstill, who started in 2006. Middle Tennessee has appeared in 12 bowl games and seven I-AA playoffs. The Blue Raiders play their home games at the Johnny "Red" Floyd Stadium which has a seating capacity of 30,788.

History

Early history (1911–1946)
Middle Tennessee State University first fielded a football team in 1911 under the direction of head coach L. T. "Mutt" Weber. From 1913–1923, Alfred B. Miles led the Blue Raiders football program. The 1914 football season led by Miles was its first undefeated season, with five straight victories after a tie with Cumberland.

Frank Faulkinberry was hired as MTSU's head coach after Miles' departure. During his tenure, the Blue Raiders compiled a record of 33–26–4. Faulkinberry was found shot to death in his garage on May 13, 1933, a suspected suicide being the cause.

E. M. Waller led the Blue Raiders for two seasons and compiled a 3–14–1 record. Waller resigned due to the team's struggles after two seasons.

Johnny Floyd started coaching MTSU in 1935 and led the Blue Raiders for four seasons. Under his tutelage, the Blue Raiders compiled a record of 30–8–1. Floyd's 1935 team went a perfect 8–0. However, a 2–6 campaign in 1938 ended his time in Murfreesboro.

Ernest Alley was named the next head coach of MTSU football, and in his one-season, the Blue Raiders compiled a 1–6–1 record.

Elwin W. Midgett led the Blue Raiders for four seasons (MTSU did not field a football team from 1943–1945 because of World War II. In 1940, Midgett led the Blue Raiders to a 4–4 mark. In 1941, the Blue Raiders posted a 4–3–1 campaign, followed by 4–2–1 in 1942, and 6–2–1 in 1946.

Charles Murphy era (1947–1968)
Charles Murphy is the longest-tenured and winningest head coach in MTSU, football history, with a 155–63–8 record in 22 seasons as MTSU's head coach. Under Murphy's tutelage, the Blue Raiders posted four undefeated seasons (1949, 1957, 1959 and 1965) along with 17 winning seasons and four bowl appearances. Murphy was asked to resign at MTSU after a 2–8 campaign in 1968.

Donald Fuoss era (1969)
Succeeding Murphy as the Blue Raiders head coach was Donald Fuoss, who only lasted for one season, a 1–9 campaign in 1969 that resulted in his firing.

Bill Peck era (1970–1974)
Bill Peck took over as head coach in 1970 and instantly brought improvement to Murfreesboro. In his first season, the Blue Raiders posted a 6–3–1 record. In 1971, MTSU posted a record of 7–4. That was followed by a 7–3–1 mark in 1972, a 4–7 mark in 1973 and a 3–8 campaign in 1974. Peck was asked to resign after back to back losing seasons to end his tenure.

Ben Hurt era (1975–1978)
Ben Hurt took over the Blue Raiders in 1975. Under his tutelage, in 1975, MTSU posted a 4–7 mark. That was followed by another 4–7 campaign in 1976. In 1977, Hurt's Blue Raiders posted a 3–8 record that was followed by a 1–9–1 1978 season, after which Hurt was fired.

James Donnelly era (1979–1998)
Austin Peay head coach James Donnelly was hired as MTSU's head coach in 1979. Under his leadership, the MTSU football program compiled a record of 133–80–1. Donnelly is the second winningest football coach in MTSU history. Of his 20 seasons at the helm, 15 of them were winning seasons (including 12 in a row) and four of them were seasons of at least 10 wins. Donnelly resigned after a 5–5 season in 1998.

Andy McCollum era (1999–2005)
Baylor assistant coach Andy McCollum took over for Donnelly in 1999. McCollum led the Blue Raiders to a 6–5 record in 2000, their first as an FBS program. In 2001, McCollum oversaw an offense that ranked fifth nationally and MTSU finished 8–3 as the runner-up behind North Texas which won the Sun Belt Conference championship. In 2005, MTSU's defense ranked ninth nationally. McCollum was fired after the 2005 season.

Rick Stockstill era (2006–present)

In 2006, South Carolina tight ends coach and recruiting coordinator Rick Stockstill got the head coaching job at Middle Tennessee State. In his first season, Stockstill led the Blue Raiders to the program's second bowl game as well as a share of the Sun Belt Conference title. He was later that year named the conference coach of the year.

The 2007 and 2008 seasons saw the Blue Raiders take a small step back with back-to-back 5–7 seasons. However, in 2009, Stockstill and the Blue Raiders went 10–3 and won the New Orleans Bowl, which was the third bowl victory in school history. Again, Stockstill was named conference coach of the year for the 2009 season. The Blue Raiders went to another bowl in 2010, and they finished the season 6–7 after losing the GoDaddy.com Bowl.

After the successful 2009 season, he turned down several offers from other schools, including Conference USA's East Carolina and Memphis, citing that it was not the right time to leave the Blue Raiders. Stockstill has led MTSU to seven bowl games in 13 years.

In 2016, Stockstill led the Blue Raiders to an 8–5, 5–3 in C-USA play to finish in third place in the East Division. They were invited to the Hawaii Bowl where they lost to Hawaii.

In 2017, Stockstill led the Blue Raiders to a 7–6, 4–4 in C-USA play to finish for a tie in third place in the East Division.  They were invited to the 2017 Camellia Bowl where they defeated Arkansas State.

Conference affiliations
Middle Tennessee has been both an independent and affiliated with multiple conferences.
 Independent (1911–1951)
 Ohio Valley Conference (1952–1998)
 Independent (1999–2000)
 Sun Belt Conference (2001–2012)
 Conference USA (2013–present)

Championships

Conference championships
Middle Tennessee has won 13 conference championships, seven outright and six shared.

† Co-championship

Division championships
As a member of Conference USA since 2013, Middle Tennessee competes in the East Division. The Blue Raiders have won one division title.

Head coaches
List of Middle Tennessee head coaches.
 L. T. "Mutt" Weber (1911–1912)
 Alfred B. Miles (1913–1916)
 Johnny Floyd (1917)
 No team (1918)
 Alfred B. Miles (1919–1923)
 Guy Stephenson (1924–1925)
 Frank Faulkinberry (1926–1932)
 E. M. Waller (1933–1934)
 Johnny Floyd (1935–1938)
 Ernest Alley (1939)
 Elwin W. Midgett (1940–1942)
 No team (1943–1945)
 Elwin W. Midgett (1946)
 Charles M. Murphy (1947–1968)
 Donald E. Fuoss (1969)
 Bill Peck (1970–1974)
 Ben Hurt (1975–1978)
 Boots Donnelly (1979–1998)
 Andy McCollum (1999–2005)
 Rick Stockstill (2006–present)

Bowl games
Middle Tennessee has appeared in 13 bowl games including four prior to joining NCAA Division I. The Blue Raiders have a record of 5–8 in those games. The Blue Raiders appeared twice in the Tangerine Bowl, now known as Citrus Bowl. The first game, played January 1, 1960, against , resulted in a 21–12 win. The second game, against Lamar Tech on December 29, 1961, was a 21–14 loss.

The Blue Raiders were invited to the Motor City Bowl in 2006 after a shared conference title with Troy. Troy earned a bid to the New Orleans Bowl with a tie-breaker over Middle Tennessee. Middle Tennessee was invited to the Motor City Bowl due to the Big Ten Conference having two teams in the Bowl Championship Series (BCS) and thus being unable to fulfill their bowl contract for the Motor City Bowl. This was the Blue Raiders' first bowl game in 42 years and their first since joining NCAA Division I. They played Central Michigan in the game and were defeated 31–14.

Middle Tennessee finished the 2009 regular season with a 9–3 record and was invited to play in the New Orleans Bowl on December 20. The team played against the Southern Miss, winning, 42–32. This was their second bowl game since joining the FBS and first ever bowl win. Quarterback Dwight Dasher was named as the game's MVP after rushing and passing for two touchdowns each.

non-Division I bowl game

NCAA Division I-AA playoff results
The Blue Raiders appeared in the NCAA Division I-AA Football Championship playoffs seven times with a record of 6–7.

Rivalries

Troy

Middle Tennessee's rivalry with Troy, now dormant following Middle Tennessee's 2013 move to Conference USA, is known as the Battle for the Palladium. Troy and Middle Tennessee first played each other in 1936, but it wasn't until 2003 that schools started playing annually for the Palladium Trophy.  Middle Tennessee leads the series 12-9.

Western Kentucky

The rivalry between Middle Tennessee and Western Kentucky, is both school's oldest rivalry, as the two programs played together for several decades in the Ohio Valley Conference before both became members of the Sun Belt Conference and then transitioned to Conference USA about the same time. The name comes from the fact that the two universities are separated by about 100 miles.

Nickname
The nickname of the Middle Tennessee athletic teams is the Blue Raiders. Female teams were long known as the Lady Raiders, but adopted the Blue Raiders name in 2007. The nickname's origin goes back to a 1934 newspaper contest. An MT football player, Charles Sarver, won $5 from Murfreesboro's The Daily News Journal with his winning entry "Blue Raiders", which he later admitted borrowing from Colgate University, whose teams were known as "Raiders" at the time. No official nickname existed prior to 1934, when teams were called "Normalites", "Teachers", and "Pedagogues".

Colors and mascot
MT is represented by the colors white and royal blue, described as PMS 301 by the university.

Lightning is the mascot of both the Middle Tennessee men and women's sports teams.

Retired numbers

Middle Tennessee has retired two jersey numbers.

All-time record vs. CUSA teams

Official record (including any NCAA imposed vacates and forfeits) against all current CUSA opponents:

Future non-conference opponents
Announced schedules as of August 9, 2022.

References

External links

 

 
American football teams established in 1911
1911 establishments in Tennessee